Asian Wings Airways was an airline based in Myanmar. It began service on 27 January 2011. It offered regular flights to all major tourist destinations in Myanmar.

Asian Wings Airways was owned and operated by Sun Far Travels and Tours Company, Limited.

All Nippon Airways announced in 2013 that it would purchase a 49% stake in Asian Wings Airways for around 3 billion Japanese yen, the first foreign investment in a Myanmar-based airline since democratization, but in 2014 ANA declared that its board of directors had agreed to cancel the investment, citing “intensified” competition in the aviation sector.

The airline suspended all operations on January 1, 2019.

Destinations
As of June 2016 the airline served the following destinations within Myanmar:

Bhamo - Bhamo Airport
Heho - Heho Airport
Homalin - Homalin Airport
Kalay - Kalaymyo Airport
Kyaingtong - Kyaingtong Airport
Kyaukpyu - Kyaukpyu Airport
Lashio - Lashio Airport
Mandalay - Mandalay International Airport, hub
Monywa - Monywa Airport
Myitkyina - Myitkyina Airport
Tachilek - Tachilek Airport
Yangon - Yangon International Airport, main hub

Fleet

Current fleet

Prior to suspending operations, the Asian Wings Airways fleet consisted of the following aircraft:

Former fleet
 2 further ATR 72-500 (2013-2016)
 1 Airbus A321 (2012-2016)

See also
List of airlines of Burma

References

External links

Airlines of Myanmar